Cornelis Meyssens or Cornelis Meijssens (Antwerp, before 1638/39 – Vienna (?)) was a Flemish engraver and printmaker, known for his reproductive prints after famous painters and portraits.  He trained in his native Antwerp and later moved to Vienna where he worked for the remainder of his life.

Life
Jacob Meyssens was born in Antwerp around 1640 as the son of the prominent engraver and print publisher Joannes Meyssens and Anna Jacobs.  He trained with his father and was registered as a 'wijnmeester' (i.e. son of a master] at the Antwerp Guild of Saint Luke in the Guild year 1660–1661.

Cornelis worked on the publication projects of his father from a young age.  In 1660 he had a portrait of Charles II of England with his signature published. The following year he was praised by Cornelis de Bie, whose Het Gulden Cabinet vande Edel Vry Schilder-Const was published by his father in 1662. The book included a number of prints engraved by Cornelis, including the frontispiece, which was made after a design by Abraham van Diepenbeeck.

He worked on various publications of his father which consisted of portraits of past and present noblemen and women of Flanders, Holland and the Holy Roman Empire.  It is possible that the publication by his father in 1663 of the Effigies Imperatorum Domus Austriacae with portraits of members of the Austrian imperial family attracted the attention of publishers in Vienna.  The fact is that from 1673 onwards he is recorded in Vienna where he lived in the Barlotti house at the Stubenthor. His children and first wife died here. He remarried in Vienna 28 February 1677 to Catharina Westhausin from Westpahlia.  In Vienna he worked on various publication projects often in cooperation with other artists and publisher from Flanders or the Dutch Republic.

The place and time of his death are not recorded but it was likely in Vienna.

Work

Meyssens worked as an engraver who produced mainly portrait engravings and frontispieces of books after designs by other artists.  He made a few reproductive prints after artworks of the masters such as his Saint Roch interceding for the Plague-stricken after Peter Paul Rubens.

Meyssens collaborated on the publication Historia di Leopoldo Cesare written by Galeazzo Gualdo Priorato and published in Vienna by the Flemish publisher from Antwerp Johann Baptist Hacque.  The first and second volumes of the book were published in 1670 and a third one in 1674. The first volume described the political and military successes of Emperor Leopold I between 1656 and 1670.  It was mainly illustrated with prints made by Flemish and Dutch printmakers after designs by other Netherlandish artists as well as artists from Germany and Italy. The illustrations mainly depict portraits of European monarchs and important aristocrats, castle scenes, battle scenes, maps and ceremonies. Apart from Meyssens, the Dutch and Flemish artists contributing were Frans Geffels, Jan de Herdt, Franciscus van der Steen, Gerard Bouttats, Adriaen van Bloemen, Sebastian van Dryweghen and Jacob Toorenvliet.  German artists Moritz Lang, Johann Martin Lerch and Johann Holst and Italians Il Bianchi, Marco Boschini and Leonardus Hen.t Venetiis also contributed.  Meyssens engraved a number of the portraits that were included in this work.

References

External links

Flemish engravers
Flemish printmakers
Artists from Antwerp
1638 births